is a fishing video game developed by SIMS. The game was released for PlayStation 2 in 2002.

Gameplay
The game is a real-time bass fishing simulator. The season and time of each stage are dictated by the internal clock of the player's PlayStation. Weather effects such as wind and waves are also depicted in real-time to increase player immersion. There are several gameplay modes: "Tournament Mode" is based on an American bass tournament, "Arcade Mode" is a score competition, "Challenge Mode" has skill-testing challenges, and "Practice Mode" is an open, un-timed fishing simulator that allows the player to customize their environment.

Reception
The game averaged a score of 51% on GameRankings.

References

External links

REAL BASS FISHING TOP ANGLER (Official Website)

2002 video games
Fishing video games
GameCube games
PlayStation 2 games
Video games developed in Japan
Cancelled Xbox games
Multiplayer and single-player video games
Xicat Interactive games